Christianity is the largest religion in England, with the Church of England being the nation's established state church, whose supreme governor is the monarch. Other Christian traditions in England include Roman Catholicism, Methodism and the Baptists. After Christianity, the religions with the most adherents are Islam, Hinduism, Sikhism, Judaism, Buddhism, modern paganism, and the Bahá'í Faith. There are also organisations promoting irreligion, including humanism and atheism.

Many of England's most notable buildings and monuments are religious in nature: Stonehenge, Westminster Abbey, Canterbury Cathedral and St Paul's Cathedral. The festivals of Christmas and Easter are widely celebrated in the country.

Statistics
The 2001 and 2011 censuses did not include on adherence to individual Christian denominations, since they were asked only in the Scottish and Northern Ireland censuses and not in England and Wales. However using the same principle as applied in the 2001 census, a survey carried out in the end of 2008 by Ipsos MORI and based on a scientifically robust sample, found the population of England and Wales to be 47.0% affiliated with the Church of England, which is also the state church, 9.6% with the Roman Catholic Church and 8.7% were other Christians, mainly Free church Protestants and Eastern Orthodox. Muslims were 4.8% and 3.4% members of other religions, 5.3% were agnostics, 6.8% were atheists and 15.0% were not sure about their religious affiliation or did not answer the question.

Abrahamic religions

Christianity

Demographics

History of Christianity

 
Saint George is recognised as the patron saint of England and the flag of England consists of his cross. Prior to Edward III, the patron saint was St Edmund and St Alban is also honoured as England's first martyr. The first Christianity in England prior to the Great Schism of 1054 AD was what is now known as Orthodox Christianity, whose saints include Saint Patrick, Saint Ethelbert, Saint Morwenna and many other English saints.

Protestantism

Church of England (Anglican Communion)

The established church of the realm is the Church of England, whose supreme governor is the British monarch (currently King Charles III) although in practise the church is governed by its bishops under the authority of Parliament. Twenty-six of the church's 42 bishops are Lords Spiritual, representing the church in the House of Lords. The dioceses of England are divided between the two provinces of Canterbury and York, both of whose archbishops are considered primates. The church regards itself as the continuation of the Catholic church introduced by St Augustine's 6th-century mission to Kent, although this is disputed owing to procedural and doctrinal changes introduced by the 16th-century English Reformation, particularly the Thirty-Nine Articles of Religion and the Book of Common Prayer. In 2010, the Church of England counted 25 million baptised members out of the 41 million Christians in Great Britain's population of about 60 million; around the same time, it also claimed to baptise one in eight newborn children. Generally, anyone in England may marry or be buried at their local parish church, whether or not they have been baptised in the church. Actual attendance has declined steadily since 1890, with around one million, or 10% of the baptised population attending Sunday services on a regular basis (defined as once a month or more) and three million- roughly 15%- joining Christmas Eve and Christmas services. It has around  active and ordained clergy.

The Free Church of England is another Anglican denomination which separated from the Church of England in the 19th century in opposition to shifts in doctrine and ceremony which brought the established church closer to Roman Catholicism. The Free Church of England is in communion with the Reformed Episcopal Church in the United States and Canada.

Catholicism

The Catholic Church in England and Wales is directed by the Catholic Bishops' Conference of England and Wales, whose current president is Vincent Nichols, the Archbishop of Westminster. To highlight the historical Catholic continuity of Nichols' office, dating back to Pope Gregory I's appointment of St. Augustine and that pope's sequent bestowal of the pallium on the appointee, the installation rites of pre-Reformation Catholic Archbishops of Canterbury and earlier Archbishops of Westminster were used at his installation as Cardinal Archbishop of Westminster. The Catholic Church was formerly forbidden from using the names of the Anglican dioceses by the 1851 Ecclesiastical Titles Act. It is divided among five provinces headed by the archbishops of Westminster, Liverpool, Birmingham, and Southwark in England and Cardiff in Wales. The Catholic Church considers itself a continuation of the earliest Celtic Christian communities, although its formal hierarchy needed to be refounded by the Gregorian mission to the Saxon kingdoms in the 6th and 7th centuries and again following the English Reformation. Papal recognition of George III as the legitimate ruler of Great Britain in 1766 opened the way for the Catholic Emancipation, easing and ultimately eliminating the anti-Catholic Penal Laws and Test Acts. This process sometimes faced great popular opposition, as during the 1780 Gordon Riots in London. Daniel O'Connell was the first Catholic member of Parliament. Considering the "actual condition of Catholicism in England," the number of Catholics, and the obstacles "removed which chiefly opposed" it, Pope Pius IX issued in 1850 the bull Universalis Ecclesiae to restore "the normal diocesan hierarchy." More recently, the royal family has been permitted to marry Roman Catholics without fear of being disqualified from succession to the throne. Recent immigration from Catholic countries, particularly Poland and Lithuania, has increased the church's numbers still more. Polling in 2009 suggested there were about 5.2 million Catholics in England and Wales, about 9.6% of the population, concentrated in the northwest. Some studies show that weekly attendance at Catholic masses now exceeds that of the Anglican services.

Other
No other church in England has more than a million members, with most quite small.

Pentecostal churches are growing and, in terms of church attendance, are now third after the Church of England and the Roman Catholic Church. There are three main denominations of Pentecostal churches: the Assemblies of God in Great Britain (part of the World Assemblies of God Fellowship), the Apostolic Church, and the Elim Pentecostal Church. Countess of Huntingdon's Connexion is a small society of evangelical churches, founded in 1783, which today has 23 congregations in England. There is also a growing number of independent, charismatic churches that encourage Pentecostal practices at part of their worship, such as Kingsgate Community Church in Peterborough, which started with 9 people in 1988 and now has a congregation in excess of 1,500.

Various forms of Protestantism developed from the ferment of the English Civil War onwards. The Quakers (formally, the Religious Society of Friends) were founded by George Fox in the 1640s. Following the Great Ejection of 1662, about a tenth of Church of England ministers gave up their livings to lead the newly formed dissenting churches. Notable dissenting groups were the Presbyterians, the Independents (or Congregationalists) and the Baptists.  In the 18th century some Presbyterians favoured ideas known as Rational Dissent which evolved into, among others, Unitarianism, which still has more than 100 congregations in the 21st century. Methodism developed from the 18th century onwards. The Methodist revival was started in England by a group of men including John Wesley and his younger brother Charles as a movement within the Church of England, but developed as a separate denomination after John Wesley's death. The primary church in England is the Methodist Church of Great Britain. The Salvation Army dates back to 1865, when it was founded in East London by William and Catherine Booth. Its international headquarters are still in London, near St Paul's Cathedral. There is one Mennonite congregation in England, the Wood Green Mennonite Church in London.

Most Greek Orthodox Church parishes fall under the jurisdiction of the Archdiocese of Thyateira and Great Britain, based in London and led by Gregorios, the Archbishop of Thyateira and Great Britain. Created in 1932, it is the diocese of the Ecumenical Patriarch of Constantinople that covers England, Wales, Scotland and Ireland as well as Malta. A Greek Orthodox community already existed at the time the UK was formed, worshipping in the Imperial Russian Embassy in London. However, it was another 130 years until an autonomous community was set up in Finsbury Park in London, in 1837. The first new church was built in 1850, on London Street in the City. In 1882, St Sophia Cathedral was constructed in London, in order to cope with the growing influx of Orthodox immigrants. By the outbreak of World War I, there were large Orthodox communities in London, Manchester and Liverpool, each focused on its own church. World War II and its aftermath also saw a large expansion among the Orthodox Communities. Today, there are seven churches bearing the title of Cathedral in London as well as in Birmingham (the Dormition of the Mother of God and St Andrew) and Leicester. In addition to these, there are eighty-one churches and other places where worship is regularly offered, twenty-five places (including university chaplaincies) where the divine liturgy is celebrated on a less regular basis, four chapels (including that of the Archdiocese), and two monasteries. As is traditional within the Orthodox Church, the bishops have a considerable degree of autonomy within the Archdiocese. The Greek Orthodox Church of St Nicholas in Toxteth, Liverpool, was built in 1870. It is an enlarged version of St Theodore's church in Constantinople and is a Grade II Listed building.

There are various Russian Orthodox groups in England. In 1962, Metropolitan Anthony (Bloom) of Sourozh founded and was for many years the bishop, archbishop and then metropolitan bishop of the diocese of the Russian Orthodox Diocese of Sourozh, the Moscow Patriarchate's diocese for Great Britain and Ireland. It is the most numerous Russian Orthodox group in the country. There are also the Russian Orthodox Church Outside Russia churches as well as some churches and communities belonging to the Patriarchal Exarchate for Orthodox Parishes of Russian Tradition in Western Europe's Episcopal Vicariate in the UK.

As well as the Russian and Greek Orthodox churches, there are also the Serbian Orthodox Church and the Ukrainian Orthodox Church all in London as well as a non-canonical Belarusian Autocephalous Orthodox Church in Manchester. The Antiochian Orthodox Church have the St. George's Cathedral in London and a number of parishes across England.

All Coptic Orthodox parishes fall under the jurisdiction of the Coptic Orthodox Church of Alexandria Pope of Alexandria. The Coptic Orthodox Church in Britain and Ireland is divided into three main districts: Ireland, Scotland, and North England; the Midlands and its affiliated areas; and South Wales. In addition, there is one Patriarchal Exarchate at Stevenage, Hertfordshire. Most British converts belong to the British Orthodox Church, which is canonically part of the Coptic Orthodox Church. There is also the Eritrean Orthodox Tewahedo Church and the Ethiopian Orthodox Tewahedo Church in London. There is also the Armenian Apostolic Church in London.

Islam

According to the 2021 United Kingdom census, 3,801,186 Muslims live in England, or 6.7% of the population. The Muslim population grew by over a million compared to the 2011 census.

According to the 2011 Census, 2.7 million Muslims live in England where they form 5.0% of the population.

Although Islam is generally thought of as being a recent arrival to the country, there has been contact with Muslims for many centuries. One example is the decision of Offa, the eighth-century King of Mercia (one of the Anglo-Saxon kingdoms existing at that time), to have coins minted with an Islamic inscription on them—copies of coins issued by the near-contemporary Muslim ruler Al-Mansur. It is thought that they were minted to facilitate trade with the expanding Islamic empire in Spain.

Muslim scholarship was well known among the learned in England by 1386, when Chaucer was writing. In the Prologue to the Canterbury Tales, there is among the pilgrims wending their way to Canterbury, a 'Doctour of Phisyk' whose learning included Razi, Avicenna (Ibn Sina, Arabic ابن سينا) and Averroes (Ibn Rushd, Arabic ابن رشد). Ibn Sina's canon of medicine was a standard text for medical students well into the 17th century.

Today Islam is the second largest religion in England.  About 38% of English Muslims live in London, where they make up 12.4% of the population. There are also large numbers of Muslims in Birmingham, Manchester, Bradford, Luton, Slough, Leicester and the mill towns of Northern England.

Notable mosques include the East London Mosque, London Central Mosque, Al-Rahma mosque, Jamea Masjid, Birmingham Central Mosque, Finsbury Park Mosque, Al Mahdi Mosque, London Markaz and Markazi mosque and the Baitul Futuh Mosque of the Ahmadiyya, which acts as its national headquarters.

Judaism

Until the 20th century, Judaism was the only noticeable non-Christian religion having first appeared in historical records during the Norman Conquest of 1066. In fact, from 1290 to 1656, Judaism did not officially exist in England due to an outright expulsion in 1290 and official restrictions that were not lifted until 1656 (though historical records show that some Jews did come back to England during the early part of the 17th century prior to the lifting of the restriction). Now, the presence of the Jewish culture and Jews in England today is one of the largest in the world.

Baháʼí Faith

The Baháʼí Faith started with the earliest mentions of the predecessor of the Baháʼí Faith, the Báb, in The Times on 1 November 1845, only a little over a year after the Báb first stated his mission. Today there are Baháʼí communities across the country from Carlisle to Cornwall.

Indian religions

Hinduism

 
Early Hindus in England were mostly students during the 19th century. There have been three waves of migration of Hindus to England since then.

Before India's Independence in 1947, Hindu migration was minuscule and largely temporary. The second wave of Hindu migration occurred in the 1970s after the expulsion of Hindus from Uganda. Initially, Hindu immigration was limited to Punjabi and Gujarati Hindus, but, by 2000, small Hindu communities of every ethnicity could be found in England. England is also host to a large immigrant community of Sri Lankan Hindus who are mostly Tamils. The last wave of migration of Hindus has been taking place since the 1990s with refugees from Sri Lanka and professionals from India.
However, there is becoming an increasing number of English Western Hindus in England, who have either converted from another faith or been an English Hindu from birth.

Sikhism

The first Sikh Gurdwara (temple) was not established until 1911, at Putney in London.

The first Sikh migration came in the 1950s. It was mostly of men from the Punjab seeking work in industries like foundries and textiles. These new arrivals mostly settled in London, Birmingham and West Yorkshire. Thousands of Sikhs from East Africa soon followed. This mass immigration was caused by Idi Amin's persecution of ethnic groups in Uganda, with thousands forced to flee the region in fear of losing their lives.

Buddhism

The earliest Buddhist influence on England came through the UK's imperial connections with South East Asia, and as a result the early connections were with the Theravada traditions of Sri Lanka, Burma and Thailand. The tradition of study resulted in the foundation of the Pali Text Society, which undertook the task of translating the Pali Canon of Buddhist texts into English.

In 1924 London's Buddhist Society was founded, and in 1926 the Theravadin London Buddhist Vihara. The rate of growth was slow but steady through the century, and the 1950s saw the development of interest in Zen Buddhism.

In the 1970s, a Theravāda monastic order consists mainly of Westerners following the Thai Forest Tradition of Ajahn Chah was established at Chithurst Buddhist Monastery in West Sussex, and also established branches monasteries elsewhere in the country.

Modern paganism

At the 2011 census 75,281 people in England identified as Pagan, doubling compared to the figures of the 2001 census. Paganism in England is dominated by Wicca, founded in England itself, the modern movement of Druidry, and forms of Heathenry.

Wicca
Wicca was developed in England in the first half of the 20th century. Although it had various terms in the past, from the 1960s onward the name of the religion was normalised to Wicca.

Heathenry

Heathenry is a modern revival of Germanic paganism such as that practiced in the British Isles by the Anglo-Saxon and Norse peoples prior to Christianisation. In the 2011 Census, 1867 people identified specifically as 'Heathen' in addition to those who identified more broadly as 'Pagan'. The largest inclusive Heathen organisation that operates in England is Asatru UK, although lacking official membership statistics, as of February 2022 had 3177 members of its Facebook group.

Druidism
During the Iron Age, Celtic polytheism was the predominant religion in the area now known as England. Neo-Druidism grew out of the Celtic revival in 18th-century Romanticism. The 2011 census states there are 4,189 Druids in England and Wales. A 2012 analysis by the Order of Bards, Ovates and Druids estimates that there are between 6,000 and 11,000 Druids in Britain.

Other religions
Other religions include:

 Spiritualism
 Ravidassia religion
 Rastafari
 Taoism
 Zoroastrianism
 Satanism
 Shinto
 New Age
 Shamanism
 Scientology
 Traditional African religion
 Animism
 Druze
 Confucianism
 Thelema
 Vodun
 Eckankar
 Brahma Kumari
 Occult
 Reconstructionism

Historical religions

These faiths, all of which are considered to be pagan, have all been predominant in the regions that later made up England, though were all made extinct through Christianisation.

Gallo-Roman religion
Gallo-Roman religion formed when the Roman Empire invaded and occupied the Brythonic peoples. Elements of the native Brythonic Celtic religion such as the druids, the Celtic priestly caste who were believed to originate in Britain, were outlawed by Claudius, and in 61 they vainly defended their sacred groves from destruction by the Romans on the island of Mona (Anglesey). However, under Roman rule the Britons continued to worship native Celtic deities, such as Ancasta, but often conflated with their Roman equivalents, like Mars Rigonemetos at Nettleham. The founding of a temple to Claudius at Camulodunum was one of the impositions that led to the revolt of Boudica.

Eastern cults such as Mithraism also grew in popularity towards the end of the occupation. The Temple of Mithras is one example of the popularity of mystery religions among the rich urban classes.

Germanic paganism
In the Early Middle Ages, immigrants from the European continent arrived, bringing Anglo-Saxon paganism, a subset of Germanic paganism, with them. Later, after most of the Anglo-Saxon peoples had converted to Christianity, Vikings from Scandinavia arrived, bringing with them Norse paganism.

Notable places of worship
The varied religious and ethnic history of England has left a wide range of religious buildings—churches, cathedrals, chapels, chapels of ease, synagogues, mosques and temples. Besides its spiritual importance, the religious architecture includes buildings of importance to the tourism industry and local pride. As a result of the Reformation, the ancient cathedrals remained in the possession of the then-established churches, while most Roman Catholic churches date from Victorian times or are of more recent construction (in Liverpool the ultra-modern Roman Catholic cathedral was actually completed before the more traditional Anglican cathedral, whose construction took most of the twentieth century). Notable places of worship include:

Amaravati Buddhist Monastery – Buddhist
Bevis Marks Synagogue – Jewish
Birmingham Central Mosque – Islamic
Brompton Oratory – Roman Catholic
Canterbury Cathedral – Church of England
Finsbury Park Mosque – Islamic
Gurdwara Sri Guru Singh Sabha – Sikh
Jamea Masjid – Islamic
London Buddhist Centre – Buddhist
London England Temple – Church of Jesus Christ of Latter-day Saints
Metropolitan Tabernacle – Baptist
Neasden Temple – Hindu
Preston England Temple – Church of Jesus Christ of Latter-day Saints
Salisbury Cathedral – C of E
Church of St Lazar – Serbian Orthodox
St Chad's Cathedral – Roman Catholic
St Paul's Cathedral – Church of England
Saint Sophia Cathedral – Greek Orthodox
Stanmore and Canons Park Synagogue – Jewish
Victoria Park Mosque – Islamic
Wat Buddhapadipa – Buddhist
Westminster Abbey – Church of England
Westminster Cathedral – Roman Catholic
Westminster Central Hall – Methodist
York Minster – Church of England

Oldham Central Mosque – Islamic

Irreligion

36.7% of people in England declared no religion in 2021, compared with 24.7% in 2011 and 14.6% in 2001. These figures are slightly lower than the combined figures for England and Wales as Wales has a higher level of irreligion than England. Brighton and Hove had the highest such proportion at 55.2%, followed by Norwich at 53.5%, Bristol and Hastings at 51.4%

See also

 Acts of Supremacy
 Dissolution of the Monasteries
 Gunpowder Plot
 History of the Church of England
 Putting away of Books and Images Act 1549
Wembley’s Conference of Living Religions 1924
Religion in the United Kingdom
Religion in Birmingham
Religion in London

References

External links
Reassessing what we collect website History of minority religions in London with objects and images

Further reading
 Bebbington, David W. Evangelicalism in Modern Britain: A History from the 1730s to the 1980s (Routledge, 2003)
 Chadwick, Owen, The Victorian Church: Vol 1 1829–1859 (1966); Victorian Church: Part two 1860–1901 (1979); a major scholarly survey
 Davie, Grace. Religion in Britain since 1945: Believing without belonging (Blackwell, 1994)
 Davies, Rupert E. et al. A History of the Methodist Church in Great Britain (3 vol. Wipf & Stock, 2017). online
 Gilley, Sheridan, and W. J. Sheils. A History of Religion in Britain: Practice and Belief from Pre-Roman Times to the Present (1994) 608pp excerpt and text search
 Hastings, Adrian. A History of English Christianity: 1920–1985 (1986) 720pp a major scholarly survey
 Hylson-Smith, Kenneth. The churches in England from Elizabeth I to Elizabeth II (1996).
 Marienberg, Evyatar. Religion in England from Prehistoric Times to the Early 1980s: With a special emphasis, when relevant, on Catholicism, and the country’s North East (2021) 135pp amazon
 Marshall, Peter. "(Re)defining the English Reformation," Journal of British Studies, July 2009, Vol. 48#3 pp. 564–586
 Thomas, Keith. Religion and the decline of magic: studies in popular beliefs in sixteenth and seventeenth-century England (1991), a study of popular religious behaviour and beliefs
 Voas, David, and Alasdair Crockett. "Religion in Britain: Neither believing nor belonging." Sociology 39.1 (2005): 11–28. online

Primary sources
 

 

Religion in the British Empire